{{DISPLAYTITLE:C15H23NO2}}
The molecular formula C15H23NO2 (molar mass: 249.34 g/mol, exact mass: 249.1729 u) may refer to:

 Alprenolol
 Castoramine, an alkaloid found in castoreum
 Ciramadol
 O-Desmethyltramadol
 Isobucaine
 Procinolol